is a railway station in the city of Ueda, Nagano, Japan, operated by the private railway operating company Ueda Electric Railway.

Lines
Shimonogō Station is served by the Bessho Line and is 6.1 kilometers from the terminus of the line at Ueda Station.

Station layout
The station consists of two ground-level side platforms serving two tracks connected by a level crossing. The platforms are not numbered. The station is one of the few stations on the line which is staffed.

Platforms

History
The station opened on 17 June 1921. It was also the terminus for the now-discontinued Ueda—Maruko Electric Railways’s Nishi-Maruko Line from 1926 to 1963.

Station numbering was introduced in August 2016 with Shimonogō being assigned station number BE09.

Passenger statistics
In fiscal 2015, the station was used by an average of 159 passengers daily (boarding passengers only).

Surrounding area
Ueda Kotsu head office 
Higashi-Shioda Post Office
Ikushimatarushima Jinja

See also
 List of railway stations in Japan

References

External links

 

Railway stations in Japan opened in 1921
Railway stations in Nagano Prefecture
Ueda Electric Railway
Ueda, Nagano